Ranotsara is a small town in southern central Madagascar.  It is 10 km west of Ambatomainty, Ikalamavony, in the Haute Matsiatra region of Fianarantsoa Province. 

Populated places in Haute Matsiatra 

*Ranotsara* gap is ecologically equivalent to palghat gap of western ghat present in india.